Yantian International Container Terminal is a deep water port in Shenzhen, Guangdong, China. It specializes in handling containers of all sorts from feeders to very large container ships.

Description
The approach channel leading to YICT is 400 meters wide and 17.4 meters deep and is only two kilometers away from the public waterway. It has a total waterfront length of eight kilometers, a yard area of 373 hectares, and 16 deep-water container berths. It is equipped with over 70 quay cranes; the majority of which are Super Post-Panamax.

See also

 Ports in China

References

External links
Wikimapia

Ports and harbours of China
Shenzhen